The 1906 Mississippi hurricane was a deadly and destructive hurricane during the 1906 Atlantic hurricane season. The fourth hurricane of the season, the system was originally observed in the western Caribbean on September 22; however, modern research revealed that the system became a tropical depression on September 19. The system slowly intensified, eventually becoming a major hurricane by September 24. The system made landfall near Pascagoula, Mississippi, during the evening of September 27, devastating the cities of Pensacola and Mobile and the state of Mississippi. Damage totaled to at least $19,221,000, and more than 134 people were killed.

Meteorological history 

The first documented information on the storm places it in the western Caribbean Sea on September 22, although modern reanalysis of this storm identifies it as a tropical depression on September 19. The hurricane was south-southwest of Havana by morning, and as it drifted north-northwestward during the evening hours of September 24, the system intensified into a Category 2 hurricane.

The system finished its passage into the Gulf of Mexico by September 27. During the afternoon, the hurricane made landfall near Pascagoula, Mississippi, as a Category 2 hurricane. The hurricane moved inland, weakening to a Category 1 hurricane and eventually to a tropical storm. The storm weakened to a tropical depression, and dissipated on September 29 as it transitioned into an extratropical storm.

Preparations and impact

Florida 

The city of Pensacola suffered the most severe damage caused by the storm. Several tugboats, vessels, fishing boats, and other watercraft were tossed along the shore of the city. Large numbers of trees were uprooted and the roofs of houses were torn off. The city's waterfront was completely flooded, along with some houses near the waterfront. Muscogee wharf was partially destroyed, broken into two pieces. On either side of the wharf, railroad tracks had been washed away. A total of 39 freight cars carrying coal were also washed away. In addition, the grain elevator of the Louisville and Nashville Railroad was destroyed during the hurricane. A timber boom was demolished during the hurricane, leaving wood and debris on the beach.

The southern end of West Main Street was completely inundated and was swept away. There was devastation between Barcelona and Perdido streets, with several boats wrecked. Between Palafox Street and Wright Street, many houses' roofs were torn away. Rail service in and out of Pensacola was severely affected; one train arrived several hours later than scheduled, and it was said that it had to stop "every few yards" in order to remove trees and debris covering the track. Between Magnolia Bluff and Milton, the track was destroyed and the Escambia Bridge was partially demolished. The fishing industry of Pensacola was estimated to have suffered at least $500,000 in damage. Many wharfs had been completely destroyed during the hurricane. Electricity was shut off during the hurricane.

Fort Barrancas, Fort Pickens, and Fort McRee suffered severe damage. At Forts Pickens and Barrancas, damage was estimated to be around $10,000. At the intersection of Cedar and Baylen streets, oyster boats, steam tugs, wood, and other debris were scattered. A boat identified as the Wolverine was tossed into a lot near the corner. Trees and chimneys were blown down, and a tin roof was peeled off a house as a result of strong winds. On the 26th port, one bark was completely destroyed, while another eleven were tossed around. A schooner that sank during the hurricane was tipped over. At the 38th port, 29 schooners were thrown ashore, and another sixteen were completely destroyed. Only eight of the 36 lumber barges floated, while three of eight tugs were floating, and of those three of them were wrecked. Other debris was scattered around the city, including pieces of shattered glass. A fire occurred at a hotel in Pensacola.

At the navy yard of Pensacola, all but three boats—the Isle de Luzon and two "water boats"—were either sunk or thrown ashore. A steel dock owned by Spain was untouched, but areas surrounding it were littered with debris. In the towns of Wosley and Warrington, waterfronts were severely damaged and some houses washed away. The damage caused in the city totaled to at least $2,620,000, while the damage within the vicinity of the city amounted to more than $1,230,000. The total damage caused within Pensacola and the surrounding areas totaled to greater than $3,850,000. The hurricane was considered the worst in the city in 170 years. However, there was widespread praise by residents and newspapers for the Weather Bureau for tracking the hurricane and issuing storm warnings three days before the storm made landfall. A total of 35 people were killed in Pensacola.

Louisiana 
In the town of Burrwood, a wharf was impacted by the hurricane's storm surge. In addition, local crops and railroads suffered severe damage. Telegraph wires were down in New Orleans after the hurricane, resulting in the loss of contact with the city. Chimneys were blown down in the city; and a resort along Lake Pontchartrain was underwater, and many houses were swept away near the hotel. Telephone service in New Orleans went down during the hurricane. It was reported that Fort St. Philip was flooded by boaters along the Mississippi River. The hurricane set a new 24-hour-record for rainfall at Colliston, where rainfall amounted to  accumulated during the hurricane.

Alabama 
The lowest air pressure recorded in Mobile was 977 mbar (hPa; 28.84 inHg). About twenty small buildings and houses were destroyed by the hurricane's winds. Most of the buildings in the city were either slightly or moderately damaged. Some shingles and roofs were blown off, while telegraph wires were down, along with other services that required electricity. In the Mobile River and Bay, a total of eleven steamships, seventeen barks and schooners, and 12 tugboats, had either been sunk or blown ashore. About  of rain was measured during the hurricane. In the areas surrounding Mobile, approximately half of all timber to be converted into turpentine was destroyed, and between 5 and 35 percent of other wood had been destroyed. The hurricane caused at least $1,650,000 in damage throughout Mobile. Telegraph wires were cut off from Mobile after the hurricane, resulting in the loss of communication with the city. It was estimated that five thousand houses were damaged in Mobile during the hurricane. The steamer Camp Carney was thrown onto St. Francis Street. Between Franscati Street and Three Mile Creek, all wharves were destroyed.

At the Christ Church Cathedral in Mobile, about $40,000 in damage was suffered, while at the St. Francis Baptist Church, damage totaled to about $10,000. Several steamers sank during the storm, including the J. P. Sehuh, Mary E. Staples, Mary S. Blees, Cama, Overton, Hattie B. Moore, City of Camden, and numerous others. One child was killed in Mobile. At Fort Morgan, many trees fell, roofs caved in, and windows were "smashed as though of tissue paper". Telegraph buildings in the city were flooded and moderately damaged. Five hotels suffered damage totaling to $21,000, while the Southern Supply Company, which was headquartered in the city, suffered $100,000 in damage. The fort's port suffered about $100,000 in damages. Six civilians were killed at the fort. Between Flomaton and Pensacola, railroad tracks of the Louisville and Nashville Railroad were torn up and blocked by trees. The section of railroad tracks between Georgian and Graceville was affected by similar damage. The railroad cancelled all services following the hurricane.

Mississippi 
In Scranton, the steamer Winona reported a minimum air pressure of 965 mbar (hPa; 28.50 inHg). Lieutenant B.L. Brockway speculated that Scranton was near the center of the hurricane at the time, due to the low pressure readings. At Biloxi, Moss Point, and Mississippi City, communications were not received. In Macon, a hotel had been demolished during the hurricane, resulting in the deaths of two people. Jackson and Brookhaven suffered a loss of at least 300,000 cotton bales, amounting to $12,000,000 in damage. In Vicksburg and McComb, many buildings were damaged, along with damage to shipping in Vicksburg, with a broken dock. The railroads and trees of Monticello suffered moderate damage: the railroad tracks were covered in trees, and service was suspended east of the town. In Hattiesburg, many cabins were blown down during the storm. Damage in Hattiesburg amounted to $300,000. In McNeil, one person was killed by a tree that was blown down.

At the Horn Island lighthouse, the hurricane killed the lighthouse keeper and his wife and daughter. In addition to the death of the three at the lighthouse, it was noted that the schooner Daisy had been dismantled there, with one person killed. A person who was climbing a small tree was thrown away by the wind and drowned. Several people were trapped in their homes after a creek topped its banks. A warehouse and four other buildings were destroyed, while a bank's roof was blown off. A train near Brookhaven was washed away along the tracks of the Mississippi Central Railroad, resulting in the injury of five people. 25 schooners along the Mississippi coastline were completely destroyed. Two barks, the Nuremberg and Hercules were destroyed during the hurricane. Mandeline, owned by Norway, was filled with water, while Sigrav suffered severe damage, completely torn apart. A boat known as the Florine was washed ashore. A total of 78 fatalities occurred.

See also 

List of Florida hurricanes (1900–1949)

References

External links 
Atlantic Hurricane Database
Monthly Weather Review
View of the Damage from the Hurricane of 1906 from the World Digital Library

 https://www.amazon.com/Tragedy-Triumph-Roy-Lula-Jones/dp/0692310932 has a lengthy chapter about the 1906 hurricane in Alabama, particularly as it relates to the oyster fleet and her family. The author's grandfather survived but his father and brother did not. She quotes extensively from local newspaper accounts at the time.

1900s Atlantic hurricane seasons
Category 3 Atlantic hurricanes
Hurricanes in Alabama
Hurricanes in Florida
Hurricanes in Louisiana
Hurricanes in Mississippi
1906 in Mississippi
1906 natural disasters in the United States
1906 meteorology